Arqiva is a British telecommunications company which provides infrastructure, broadcast transmission and smart meter facilities in the United Kingdom. The company is headquartered at the former Independent Broadcasting Authority headquarters at Crawley Court in the village of Crawley, Hampshire, just outside Winchester. Its main customers are broadcasters and utility companies, and its main asset is a network of circa. 1,500 radio and television transmission sites. It is owned by a consortium of investors led by CPP (Canada Pension Plan) and the Australian investment house Macquarie Bank. Arqiva is a patron of the Radio Academy.

Through its Now Digital subsidiary, it operates various local digital radio ensembles.

History
The company, which has a history that dates back to the beginning of regular public broadcasting in the United Kingdom, was actually only formed in 2005. Below is a potted history of the various organisations that are now part of Arqiva:

BBC
Responsibility for the transmitter assets of the BBC lay solely within the corporation from its foundation in 1922 until 1997. The assets were then split into a separate company, prior to being sold.

The domestic transmitter network was purchased by a US company, Crown Castle, when it was privatised in 1997. Subsequently, in 2004, this was purchased by National Grid plc, which merged in its own private communication network, the name changing to National Grid Wireless in October 2005. Transmitters used by the BBC overseas services were sold to a new startup company, called Merlin Communications.

National Grid
National Grid plc had a large internal network for the communication of its engineers serving initially the electricity companies, but subsequently, the gas industry as well. This company developed on the back of the growth in mobile phones, and its large portfolio of tower locations. This was added to by the purchase of the former BBC network (as above).

National Grid Wireless, as it became, led a consortium bidding for the second UK national DAB multiplex licence, but was unsuccessful. The licence was awarded instead to 4 Digital Group in July 2007.

Independent Television Authority (ITA) / Independent Broadcasting Authority (IBA)
The Television Act 1954 gave birth to the Independent Television Authority (ITA). The ITA appointed and regulated a number of regional programme contractors, and built and operated a network of transmitters.

The Sound Broadcasting Act 1972 created legal commercial radio in the UK for the first time. It was modelled on ITA, in that programmes were made by local contractors while the regulator, renamed the Independent Broadcasting Authority, owned and operated the transmitters.

ITC, Ofcom, Radio Authority and Transcom
The Broadcasting Act 1990 split the IBA into three bodies. The Independent Television Commission (ITC) regulated commercial TV and the Radio Authority (RA) regulated commercial radio. The IBA's engineering division, which operated the transmitters as well as doing research and development, became an independent company called National Transcommunications Limited (NTL), also known as "Transcom". At this point, technical standards regulation, previously carried out in accordance with the IBA engineering "Code of Practice", seems to have disappeared from the regulatory landscape.

CableTel, Simoco, NTL
Transcom was acquired by International CableTel, which subsequently built its brand around the NTL name. It ran up huge debts during the dot-com boom which crippled the company for many years. In 1998, NTL acquired the UK antenna sites business of Simoco, a private mobile radio (PMR) company formed from Philips Telecom – PMR. In 1999 NTL acquired the UK field service operations business of Simoco. In 2004, NTL sold its 'broadcast unit' to Macquarie Communications Infrastructure Group, but continued as a cable operator.

Macquarie
In January 2005, Macquarie Communications Infrastructure Group renamed its new subsidiary Arqiva.
Subsequently in July 2009, Macquarie sold off a substantial part of its holding and moved the remaining amount to its investment fund. Canada Pension Plan Investment Board (CPPIB) now has a 48% holding and Macquarie European Infrastructure Fund 2 (MEIF 2) has 21%, with other Macquarie Group funds holding 13%

Inmedia
Arqiva acquired Inmedia Communications from the Carlyle Group for £68.5 million in July 2005 to form the new Satellite Media Solutions business unit. Inmedia was owned by Kingston Communications and known as Kingston inmedia before being bought by the Carlyle Group in 2004.

BT Broadcast
Arqiva announced the signing of a sale and purchase agreement (SPA) with BT to acquire the full-time service components of BT’s Satellite Broadcast Services business for £25 million in cash in November 2006. The deal will include long-term customer contracts, operations and personnel located in the USA, France, Italy and the Netherlands, as well as the UK. Deal completion is subject to regulatory approval in the UK and Germany.

National Grid Wireless
Arqiva purchased National Grid Wireless on 3 April 2007 for £2.5 billion. The company planned to run NGW as a separate company – Macquarie UK Broadcast Ventures Ltd – pending review of the deal by competition regulators. Regulatory agreement was reached in late 2008 and National Grid Wireless was amalgamated into Arqiva. The new company employs around 775 people and operates all the TV and most of the radio transmitters in the UK (BBC national and local and many commercial stations). It is deemed to be a monopoly operator and as such is regulated by Ofcom.

JFMG
Arqiva purchased PMSE band manager JFMG 19 February 2009. JFMG were contracted by communications regulator Ofcom to provide spectrum management and licensing services for programme making and special events (PSME). In May 2015 Ofcom made the decision to end the contract with Arqiva and to insource the existing services.

Recent activity

OneVision DTT Licence application

During 2009, Arqiva were involved in the possibility of provision of digital pay TV in Ireland.

SeeSaw

In March 2010, Arqiva invested in and launched a catch-up Internet television, IPTV service called SeeSaw.
Subsequently the holding in the company was reduced to 25%.

WiFi

In July 2012, Arqiva bought Spectrum Interactive, a wholesale only WiFi provider.

In 2016, Arqiva sold its WiFi business to Virgin Media.

Sale of telecommunications business

In October 2019, the company sold its telecommunication business to Cellnex.

Change of ownership
In June 2022, Digital 9 Infrastructure acquired a 48% stake in Arqiva from the Canada Pension Plan.

Notable transmitter sites 
 Alexandra Palace()
 Angus()
 Arfon
 Ashkirk
 Ashton Moss ( & )
 Beacon Hill ( & )
 Belmont
 Black Hill
 Black Mountain
 Bilsdale West Moor
 Blaenplwyf
 Bluebell Hill
 Bressay
 Brookmans Park
 Brougher Mountain
 Burghead
 Burnhope
 Caldbeck
 Caradon Hill
 Carmel
 Chatton
 Chillerton Down
 Clevedon
 Craigkelly
 Croydon
 Crystal Palace
 Darvel
 Daventry
 Divis
 Douglas
 Dover
 Droitwich
 Durris
 Eitshal
 Emley Moor
 Forfar
 Fort William
 Frémont Point
 Hannington
 Haverfordwest
 Heathfield
 Holme Moss
 Huntshaw Cross
 Isles of Scilly
 Keelylang Hill
 Kilvey Hill
 Kirk o'Shotts
 Knock More
 Les Platons
 Lichfield
 Limavady
 Lisnagarvey
 Llanddona
 Llangollen
 Londonderry
 Manningtree
 Meldrum
 Melvaig
 Membury
 Mendip
 Mendlesham
 Midhurst
 Moel-y-Parc
 Moorside Edge
 Mounteagle
 North Hessary Tor
 Oban
 Oxford
 Peterborough
 Pontop Pike
 Preseli
 Redruth
 Ridge Hill
 Rosemarkie
 Rowridge
 Rumster Forest
 Sandale
 Sandy Heath
 Selkirk
 Skriaig
 Plymouth
 Stagshaw
 St. Hilary
 St Thomas
 Start Point
 Stockland Hill
 Strabane
 Sudbury
 Sutton Coldfield
 Swingate
 Tacolneston
 Tapton Hill/Sheffield (Crosspool)
 Thrumster
 Torosay
 Waltham
 Washford
 Wenvoe
 Westerglen
 West Kirby
 Winter Hill
 The Wrekin
 Wrotham
 Zouches Farm

See also
 Digital One (A joint venture with GCap Media providing UK DAB - wholly owned by Arqiva since 11 February 2008)
 2RN in Ireland
 Freeview
 VT Communications (Formerly Merlin Communications, formed from privatisation of BBC World Service transmitter sites.)

References

Sources
 Pawley, Edward (1972). BBC Engineering 1922–1972. London, BBC. 
 Shacklady, Norman and Ellen, Martin (2003). On Air: A History of BBC Transmission. Wavechange Books.  (paperback)  (hardback).

External links
 
 Arqiva Online Virtual Tour

Telecommunications companies of the United Kingdom
2005 establishments in the United Kingdom
2005 mergers and acquisitions